Sternobrithes is a genus of flies in the family Stratiomyidae.

Species
Sternobrithes mercurialis (Lindner, 1938)
Sternobrithes picticornis (Bigot, 1879)
Sternobrithes tumidus Loew, 1857

References

Stratiomyidae
Brachycera genera
Taxa named by Hermann Loew
Diptera of Africa